What It Is is the third album by the rapper, PSD. It was released on October 5, 1999, for Swerve Records and was produced by PSD, Phillip Armstrong, J-Cutt, Bernard Gourley and Lev Berlak.

Track listing
"See 'Bout Me" - 4:53  
"Loddi Doddi" - 4:22  
"Blow Yours With Mine" - 3:27 (featuring Remixx) 
"What It Is" - 3:46  
"Dot Mae" - 4:29  
"For All My Dawgs" - 5:21  
"Playa Playa" - 3:21  (featuring Dubee)
"Scrillagetta" - 3:27  
"Peripheral View" - 4:00  
"The Way We Roll" - 3:54  (featuring Dubee)
"Shake Somethin'" - 4:35 (featuring Remixx) 
"Lay Down and Stay Down" - 3:47  
"Off Yo' Ass" - 3:57 (featuring Jay Tee)

1999 albums
PSD (rapper) albums